My Side of the Street is the twelfth studio album by Australian recording artist Adam Brand. The album was released on 8 August 2014 and peaked at number 5 on the ARIA charts. Upon release Brand said "I went into the studio this time around with no rulebook whatsoever. I just went in there with the songs that spoke to me the most, and with no pre-conceived ideas as to how it was supposed to sound."

Brand toured the album commencing in Sale, Victoria on 3 September 2014 and ending in Ravenswood, Queensland on 19 October 2014.

The album was nominated for ARIA Award for Best Country Album at the ARIA Music Awards of 2014 This is Brand's fifth ARIA Award nomination in this category.

Reception

Sebastian Skeet from The Music said "Brand walks a fine line between country and straight-out pop. Fans of Brand will enjoy the brash guitars and raspy vocals on tracks like "My Side of the Street" and the single "What Your Love Looks Like", which is a long way from traditional country. It's not until midway through that we get to hear the twang of country on "Girls These Days" and "Put 'em On Me"". Skeet added "The less said about the cover of Billy Thorpe's signature tune the better."

Track listing

Charts
My Side of the Street is Brand's second top five on the ARIA Albums chart, following on from There Will Be Love in August 2012. The album also gives Brand his fourth No.1 on the ARIA Country Albums chart.

Weekly charts

Year-end charts

Release history

References

2014 albums
Adam Brand (musician) albums